Charles Dinsmoor (September 19, 1834 – April 11, 1904) was an American inventor and lawyer. He was admitted to the bar of Warren County, Pennsylvania. He served in several government-related positions and participated in community social affairs related to education in Warren, Pennsylvania. As an inventor Dinsmoor was involved with patenting the continuous track tractor, which is the forerunner of the tracked vehicles used in construction and the military.

Early life
Dinsmoor's ancestors came from Ireland but were from Scottish descent. Dinsmoor was born at Alabama Center in Alabama, New York, on September 19, 1834. His family genealogy can be traced back to the first person in his family history to arrive in America, John Dinsmoor. He came to America in 1719 from Londonderry, Ireland, and is the fifth-generation ancestor to Dinsmoor. He originally settled in Windham, New Hampshire. Among the ancestors of Dinsmoor are Samuel Dinsmoor, who was a governor of New Hampshire and a member of Congress in 1811 and 1812, and who was a son of John Dinsmoor. Samuel Dinsmoor Jr. was also a governor of New Hampshire. Robert Dinsmoor, brother to Samuel Dinsmoor Sr., was a well-known Scottish poet of New England that called himself the "Rustic Bard." William B. Dinsmoor was the president of the Adams Express Company. Colonel Silas Dinsmoor was famous as an Indian agent. A son of Samuel Jr. was George (born 1794 in Keene, New Hampshire), the father of Dinsmoor. He was a farmer and lumberman. Dinsmoor's mother was Katherine Harper from an English family line.

Dinsmoor received a minimal education in the local common schools of Elk township in Warren County, Pennsylvania, when he was growing up. Much of his time was spent helping support the large family living in meager circumstances. At sixteen Dinsmoor left home and became a student at the academies at Warren, Smethport, and Coudersport, Pennsylvania. He was also a student for one year at Randolph Academy during the years 1856 and 1857 at Randolph, New York. He was in the printing business for about eleven years in the same cities and taught while attending school. He was editor of the "Warren Ledger" at Warren during the last three years. He became its associate editor in 1861 and held that position until 1863.

Mid life
Dinsmoor started a year long course at Randolph Academy when he was twenty-two years old. There he studied law for six months at the offices of Weeden & Henderson. Dinsmoor then continued his law studies under B. W. Lacy in 1858. He was admitted to the bar of Warren County, Pennsylvania, on September 18, 1859. He was appointed assistant United States marshal in 1860. One of his duties was taking the 1860 census for the northern half of Warren County. Dinsmoor was elected justice of the peace for Warren County in 1861 and was successively reelected for fifteen years. He also practiced law during that time. In 1876 he voluntarily retired from the judicial office.

Dinsmoor has been elected to many positions in government, from being a town clerk to a chief burgess. In 1878 he was elected to the office of school director and held that position for many years. He contributed much to bring about standards for the schools of Warren. Dinsmoor was for several years on the Board of Control and treasurer of Struthers Library Association. Dinsmoor was a lawyer in the Supreme Court of the state of Pennsylvania and the United States Circuit and District Courts. Dinsmoor was associated with the order of Odd Fellows from 1868 for many years and was grand master of Warren Lodge No. 339.

Later life
Dinsmoor practiced law without a partner for many years. Later he became associated with James Cable and formed the partnership Dinsmoor & Cable. Later when Cable died the firm's name changed to Dinsmoor & Peterson. After Peterson died Dinsmoor then conducted business by himself for several years. The last five years of his life he had failing health until he died April 11, 1904.

Personal life 
Dinsmoor married Elizabeth Morrison in October 1861. They had four children; Imogen who was born October 17, 1867; Loten who was born January 25, 1870; Harry who was born August 1, 1873; and Frederick who was born January 13, 1875.

Notability
Dinsmoor sketched an endless chain tractor in 1886, (a full half century after John Heathcote's patent of 1832, see the page on Continuous Track), a forerunner of the endless tread continuous track vehicle. He received patent No. 351,749 on November 2, 1886. "Dinsmoor's vehicle" was first manufactured commercially by Holt Manufacturing Company of Stockton, California, in 1906. Dinsmoor Glacier of Antarctica is named after Dinsmoor.

Footnotes

Sources

 
 
 
 
 
 
 Scientific American, December 18, 1886. Vol. LV., No. 25

Further reading 
 Richmond, George, President, Biographical Publishing Company, Book of Biographies - Biographical Sketches of leading citizens of the 37th judicial district, Pennsylvania (Charles Dinsmoor) Buffalo, N.Y., 1899

19th-century American inventors
People from Warren County, Pennsylvania
1834 births
1904 deaths
United States Marshals